Rachel Windvogel is a South African politician who has served as a Member of the Western Cape Provincial Parliament since May 2019. Windvogel is a member of the African National Congress. She is the ANC's shadow MEC for Health as she serves on the Standing Committee on Health in the legislature.

References

External links

Living people
Year of birth missing (living people)
Coloured South African people
Members of the Western Cape Provincial Parliament
African National Congress
21st-century South African politicians
Women members of provincial legislatures of South Africa